Ancylosis ocellella is a species of snout moth in the genus Ancylosis. It was described by Ragonot, in 1901, and is known from South Africa and Namibia.

References

Moths described in 1901
ocellella
Insects of Namibia
Moths of Africa